Pamela Suzette Grier (born May 26, 1949) is an American actress and singer. Described by Quentin Tarantino as cinema's first female action star (although, there are some who dispute that claim and believe Cheng Pei-pei actually holds that distinction), she achieved fame for her starring roles in a string of 1970s action, blaxploitation and women in prison films for American International Pictures and New World Pictures. Her accolades include nominations for an Emmy Award, a Golden Globe Award, a Screen Actors Guild Award, a Satellite Award and a Saturn Award.

Grier came to prominence with her titular roles in the films Coffy (1973) and Foxy Brown (1974); her other major films during this period included The Big Doll House (1971), Women in Cages (1971), The Big Bird Cage (1972), Black Mama, White Mama (1973), Scream Blacula Scream (1973), The Arena (1974), Sheba, Baby (1975), Bucktown (1975) and Friday Foster (1975). She portrayed the title character in Tarantino's crime film Jackie Brown (1997), and also appeared in Escape from L.A. (1996), Jawbreaker (1999), Holy Smoke!, (1999), Bones (2001), Just Wright (2010), Larry Crowne (2011) and Poms (2019).

On television, Grier portrayed Eleanor Winthrop in the Showtime comedy-drama series Linc's (1998–2000), Kate "Kit" Porter on the Showtime drama series The L Word (2004–2009), and Constance Terry in the ABC sitcom Bless This Mess (2019–2020). She received praise for her work in the animated series Happily Ever After: Fairy Tales for Every Child (1999).

IndieWire named Grier one of the best actors never to have received an Academy Award nomination.

Early life 
Grier was born on May 26, 1949, in Winston-Salem, North Carolina, the daughter of Gwendolyn Sylvia (née Samuels), a homemaker and nurse, and Clarence Ransom Grier, Jr., who worked as a mechanic and technical sergeant in the United States Air Force. She has one sister and one brother. Grier said she is of mixed ancestry, namely of African American, Hispanic, Chinese, Filipino, and Cheyenne heritage. She was raised Catholic and later baptized as a Methodist.

Because of her father's military career, the family moved frequently during Grier's childhood. In 1956, they relocated to Swindon in South West England, United Kingdom, where her father worked on an airforce base. By Grier's account, hers was one of the only black families in town, though she recalled that they faced no racism or segregation compared to that in the United States: "They didn’t care that I was black since they hadn’t been raised to hate blacks. Instead they’d been raised to hate Germans... In the U.S., especially in the South, we were never able to get buses to stop for us, we couldn’t eat in certain restaurants, couldn’t use certain bathrooms. Up until 1969, there were department stores in which my father and I weren’t even allowed to try on clothing."

The family returned to the United States in 1958, when Grier's father was transferred to California's Travis Air Force Base, eventually settling in  Denver, Colorado, near Lowry Air Force Base. Grier spent part of her upbringing on her maternal grandparents' sugar beet farm in rural Wyoming, where their ancestors had homesteaded after fleeing west via the Underground Railroad to escape slavery. Grier attended East High School in Denver, and appeared in a number of stage productions, as well as participating in beauty contests to raise money for college tuition at Metropolitan State College.

Career 

Grier moved to Los Angeles, California, in 1967, where she was initially hired to work the switchboard at American International Pictures (AIP). She is believed to have been discovered by the director Jack Hill, and was cast in Roger Corman women-in-prison films such as The Big Doll House (1971), Women in Cages (1971) and The Big Bird Cage (1972). While under contract at AIP, she became a staple of early 1970s blaxploitation movies, playing bold, assertive women, beginning with Hill's Coffy (1973), in which she plays a nurse who seeks revenge on drug dealers. Her character was advertised in the trailer as the "baddest one-chick hit-squad that ever hit town!" The film, which was filled with sexual and violent elements typical of the genre, was a box-office hit. Grier is considered to be the first African-American female to headline an action film, as protagonists of previous blaxploitation films were men. In his review of Coffy, critic Roger Ebert praised the film for its believable female lead. He noted that Grier was an actress of "beautiful face and astonishing form" and that she possessed a kind of "physical life" missing from many other attractive 

Grier played similar characters in the AIP films Foxy Brown (1974), Sheba, Baby, and Friday Foster (both 1975). With the demise of blaxploitation later in the 1970s, Grier appeared in smaller roles for many years. She acquired progressively larger character roles in the 1980s, including a druggie prostitute in Fort Apache, The Bronx (1981) and a witch in Something Wicked this Way Comes (1983). In 1985, Grier made her theatrical debut in Sam Sheppard's Fool for Love at the Los Angeles Theatre Center.

Grier returned to film as Steven Seagal's detective partner in Above the Law (1988). She had a recurring role on Miami Vice from 1985 to 1989 and made guest appearances on Martin, Night Court, and The Fresh Prince of Bel Air. She had a recurring role in the TV series Crime Story between 1986 and 1988. Her role in Rocket Gibraltar (1988) was cut due to fears by the film's director, Daniel Petrie, of "repercussions from interracial love scenes." She appeared on Sinbad, Preston Chronicles, The Cosby Show, The Wayans Brothers Show, and Mad TV. In 1994, Grier appeared in Snoop Dogg's video for "Doggy Dogg World".

In the late 1990s Grier was a cast member of the Showtime series Linc's. She appeared in 1996 in John Carpenter's Escape from L.A. and 1997 with the title role in Quentin Tarantino's Jackie Brown, films that partly paid homage to her 1970s blaxploitation movies. She was nominated for numerous awards for her work in the Tarantino film. Grier appeared on Showtime's The L Word, in which she played Kit Porter. The series ran for six seasons and ended in March 2009. Grier occasionally guest-stars in such television series as Law & Order: Special Victims Unit (where she is a recurring character).

In 2010 Grier began appearing in a recurring role on the hit science-fiction series Smallville as the villain Amanda Waller, also known as White Queen, head agent of Checkmate, a covert operations agency. She appeared as a friend and colleague to Julia Roberts' college professor in 2011's Larry Crowne.

In 2010, Grier wrote her memoir, Foxy: My Life in Three Acts, with Andrea Cagan.

Grier received an honorary Doctorate of Humane Letters from the University of Maryland Eastern Shore in 2011. That same year, she received an honorary Doctorate of Science from Langston University.

According to Essence magazine, in Grier's career, "[s]o revolutionary were the characters Grier played that women reportedly would stand on chairs and cheer."

She founded the Pam Grier Community Garden and Education Center with the National Multicultural Western Heritage Museum. The purpose is to teach people about organic gardening, health and nutrition among other things. The museum named its first garden in honor of Grier in 2011.

In January 2018, Grier revealed a biopic based on her memoir is in the works, entitled Pam.

In April 2022, Turner Classic Movies (TCM) announced the fourth season of their podcast, The Plot Thickens, would focus on Grier's life and career.

Personal life 
Grier lives on a ranch in Colorado.

Grier met the basketball player Ferdinand Lewis (Lew) Alcindor before he became a Muslim; soon after they began dating, he converted to Islam and changed his name to Kareem Abdul-Jabbar. Abdul-Jabbar proposed to Grier, but gave her an ultimatum to convert to Islam. He said, "If you don't commit to me today, I'm getting married at 2 this afternoon. She's a converted Muslim, and she's been prepared for me," adding, "once you become Muslim, you might appreciate another wife." Grier declined, so he got married that day.

Grier met the comedian Freddie Prinze while promoting her film Coffy in 1973. They began a relationship and considered marriage. Prinze wanted her to have his baby, but she was reluctant due to his history of depression and drug addiction. They remained in touch after she left him. She was one of the last people Prinze spoke to before he died in 1977.

Grier met the comedian Richard Pryor through her relationship with Prinze, but they did not begin dating until they were both cast in Greased Lightning. She helped Pryor learn to read and tried to help him with his drug addiction. After six months of sobriety, he relapsed. In her memoir, Grier described how her sexual relationship with Pryor caused cocaine to enter her system. Grier confronted Pryor about protecting her health, but he refused to use a condom. Pryor married Deborah McGuire while dating Grier in 1977.

Grier was formerly romantically linked to Jimmie “Big Wheel" Wheeler, a famous boxing promoter, Soul Train host Don Cornelius and basketball player Wilt Chamberlain. In 1998, Grier was engaged to RCA Records executive Kevin Evans, but the engagement ended in 1999.

Grier was diagnosed with stage-four cervical cancer in 1988, and was told she had 18 months to live. Through vigorous treatment she made a recovery and has been in remission.

Filmography

Film

Television

Video games

Music videos

Discography 
 "Long Time Woman" (1971, from the film The Big Doll House)
 Communication by Bobby Womack (1971, backing vocals)
 Understanding by Bobby Womack (1972, backing vocals)

Bibliography 
 2010: Foxy: My Life in Three Acts

Accolades

Awards 

 1998: San Diego Film Critics Society Award for Best Actress  — Jackie Brown
 1999: Acapulco Black Film Festival Career Achievement Award
 2000: Csapnivalo Award for Best Female Performance — Jackie Brown
 2001: High Falls Film Festival Susan B. Anthony 'Failure is Impossible' Award
 2003: Special Achievement in Film Trumpet Award
 2008: RiverRun International Film Festival Master of Cinema Award
 2018: 20/20 Award for Best Actress — Jackie Brown
 2018: Catalonian International Film Festival Time-Machine Honorary Award
 2018: Tallgrass International Film Festival Ad Astra Award

Nominations 

 1997: Awards Circuit Community Award for Best Actress in a Leading Role — Jackie Brown
 1998: Chicago Film Critics Association Award for Best Actress  — Jackie Brown
 1998: Empire Award for Best Actress — Jackie Brown
 1998: Golden Globe Award for Best Actress – Motion Picture Musical or Comedy — Jackie Brown
 1998: NAACP Image Award for Outstanding Actress in a Motion Picture — Jackie Brown
 1998: Online Film & Television Association for Best Drama Actress — Jackie Brown
 1998: Satellite Award for Best Actress – Motion Picture Musical or Comedy — Jackie Brown
 1998: Saturn Award for Best Actress — Jackie Brown
 1998: Screen Actors Guild Award for Outstanding Performance by a Female Actor in a Leading Role — Jackie Brown
 1999: NAACP Image Award for Outstanding Actress in a Comedy Series — Linc's
 2000: NAACP Image Award for Outstanding Actress in a Comedy Series — Linc's
 2000: Daytime Emmy Award for Outstanding Performer in an Animated Program — Happily Ever After: Fairy Tales for Every Child
 2002: Black Reel Award for Best Actress in a Motion Picture — Bones
 2002: NAACP Image Award for Outstanding Actress in a Television Movie, Mini-Series or Dramatic Special — 3 A.M.
 2002: Black Reel Award for Best Actress in Network/Cable Series — 3 A.M.
 2003: NAACP Image Award for Outstanding Supporting Actress in a Drama Series — Law & Order: Special Victims Unit
 2004: NAACP Image Award for Outstanding Supporting Actress in a Drama Series — Law & Order: Special Victims Unit
 2005: NAACP Image Award for Outstanding Supporting Actress in a Drama Series — The L Word
 2006: NAACP Image Award for Outstanding Supporting Actress in a Drama Series — The L Word
 2008: NAACP Image Award for Outstanding Supporting Actress in a Drama Series — The L Word

References

Further reading

External links 

 
 
 
 Pam Grier Happy Birthday, Pam Grier: Interview with the Accidental Action Heroine at Bright Lights Film Journal

1949 births
20th-century American actresses
21st-century American actresses
Actors from Winston-Salem, North Carolina
Actresses from Denver
Actresses from Los Angeles
Actresses from North Carolina
Actresses from Wyoming
African-American actresses
American actresses of Chinese descent
American actresses of Filipino descent
American aikidoka
American jujutsuka
American stage actresses
American television actresses
Hispanic and Latino American actresses
Living people
Metropolitan State University of Denver alumni
People from Denver
American people who self-identify as being of Native American descent
20th-century African-American women
20th-century African-American people
21st-century African-American women